Leah Smith may refer to:

 Leah King-Smith, Australian artist
 Leah Song (born Leah Smith), American singer-songwriter and musician
 Leah Smith (swimmer) (born 1995), American swimmer
 Leah M. Smith, Canadian biostatistician and cancer researcher